The 1616 Walnut Street Building or 1616 Building is a historic high-rise building in the Center City area of Philadelphia, Pennsylvania. A twenty-four-story building, it stands ninety-four meters tall.

Listed on the Philadelphia Register of Historic Places on January 7, 1982, it was then also listed on the National Register of Historic Places in 1983.

History and features
 In 1930, the architects received an award for the building's design at the 12th International Buildings Congress in Budapest.

Its five-story parking garage on the Chancellor Street side, part of the original construction, was considered a novelty in 1929.

It was listed on the National Register of Historic Places in 1983, and the Philadelphia Register of Historic Places on January 7, 1982.

Residential conversion
In 2013, 1616 Walnut Street was renamed "Icon" as it underwent an extensive renovation, transforming it from commercial space to an apartment building.

References

External links

1616 Walnut Street at Philadelphia Architects and Buildings
 Icon Apartments Icon Apartments Philadelphia

Commercial buildings on the National Register of Historic Places in Philadelphia
Office buildings completed in 1929
Philadelphia Register of Historic Places
Rittenhouse Square, Philadelphia
Residential skyscrapers in Philadelphia